Balanophyllia bonaespei is a species of solitary cup coral, a stony coral in the family Dendrophylliidae. It is an azooxanthellate species that does not contain symbiotic dinoflagellates in its tissues as most corals do.

Description
Cup corals are solitary hard corals which superficially resemble orange sea anemones. They grow to 1–2 cm in diameter. They have almost transparent beaded tentacles.

Distribution
This species is known from Saldanha Bay to East London off the South African coast, and lives from  under water.

Ecology
This species is often found in caves or under dark overhangs.

References

Dendrophylliidae
Animals described in 1938